The Taqwacores is a 2010 film adaptation of the 2003 novel The Taqwacores by Michael Muhammad Knight.  The film was directed by Eyad Zahra and stars Bobby Naderi, Dominic Rains, and Noureen Dewulf.  The film imagines a fictitious Islamic punk rock scene through characters living in a punk house in Buffalo, New York.  It was filmed in Cleveland, Ohio.

Plot
A sophomore majoring in engineering, Yusef (Bobby Naderi) seeks living quarters with fellow Muslims after a year in the godless dorms. He moves—rather improbably, given his conservative nature—into a building inhabited by various punky misfits (it is unclear whether they are also students) wrestling with their cultural and religious identity. Or, as red-mohawked guitarist Jehangir (Dominic Rains) puts it, their "mismatching of disenfranchised subcultures."

Others include ever-shirtless skateboarding wild man Amazing Ayyub (Volkan Eryaman), spike-haired stoner Fasiq (Ian Tran) and brawny, glowering Umar (Nav Mann), the would-be moral enforcer in a houseful of rebels against Koranic strictures. Sole female in residence is Rabeya (Noureen DeWulf), who wears a head-to-toe burka yet is full of ideas that might be considered blasphemous.

Cast
(in alphabetical order) 
 Noureen DeWulf as Rabeya
 Jim Dickson as Gas Station Bully
 Volkan Eryaman as Amazing Ayyub
 Denise George as Dee Dee Ali
 Marwan Kamel as himself (Cameo)
 Anne Leighton as Lynn
 Nav Mann as Umar
 Rasika Mathur as Fatima
 John Charles Meyer as Hamza
 Bobby Naderi as Yusef
 Dominic Rains as Jehangir Tabari
 Nicholas Riley as Harun
 Ara Thorose as Lead Singer of The Ghilmans
 Ian Tran as Fasiq
 Tony Yalda as Muzzamil

Music
The Taqwacores features an original score by Los Angeles composer, Omar Fadel, as well as licensed music from The Kominas, Sagg Syndicate and Al-Thawra.

References

External links
 Official website
 

2010 films
Films about LGBT and Islam
Taqwacore
Films set in New York (state)
Punk films
2010s English-language films